The 1 euro cent coin (€0.01) has a value of one hundredth of a euro and is composed of copper-covered steel. It is the lowest-value coin in the Eurozone, the next highest are the 2 and 5 euro cent coins. The coins of every Euro country have a common reverse and each has a country-specific (national) obverse. The coin has been used since 2002 and was not redesigned in 2007 as was the case with the higher-value coins.

History
The coin dates from 2001, when euro coins and banknotes were introduced in the 12-member eurozone and its related territories. The common side was designed by Luc Luycx, a Belgian artist who won a Europe-wide competition to design the new coins. The design of the 1- to 5-cent coins was intended to show the European Union's (EU) place in the world (relative to Africa and Asia), as opposed to the one- and two-euro coins showing the 15 states as one and the 10- to 50-cent coins showing separate EU states.

The national sides, then 15 (eurozone + Monaco, San Marino and the Vatican, who could mint their own), were each designed according to national competitions, though to specifications which applied to all coins, such as the requirement of including twelve stars (see euro coins for more). National designs were not allowed to change until the end of 2008, unless a monarch (whose portrait usually appears on the coins) dies or abdicates. This happened in Monaco and the Vatican City, resulting in three new designs in circulation (the Vatican had an interim design until the new Pope was selected). National designs have seen some changes due to new rules stating that national designs should include the name of the issuing country (Finland and Belgium both do not show their name, and hence have made minor changes).

As the EU's membership has since expanded in 2004 and 2007, with further expansions envisaged, the common face of all euro coins from the value of 10 cents and above were redesigned in 2007 to show a new map. The 1- to 5-cent coins, however, did not change, as the highlighting of the old members over the globe was so faint it was not considered worth the cost. However, new national coin designs were added: in 2007 for Slovenia; in 2008 for Cyprus and Malta; in 2009 for Slovakia; in 2011 for Estonia; in 2014 for Latvia; in 2015 for Lithuania; and in 2023 for Croatia.

Design
The coins are composed of copper-covered steel, with a diameter of 16.25 mm, a 1.67 mm thickness and a mass of 2.30 grams. The coins' edges are smooth. The coins have been used from 2002, though some are dated 1999 which is the year the euro was created as a currency, but not put into general circulation.

Reverse (common) side
The reverse was designed by Luc Luycx and displays a globe in the bottom right. The then-fifteen members of the EU are lightly highlighted and the northern half of Africa and the western half of Asia (including the Middle East) are shown. Six fine lines cut diagonally behind the globe from each side of the coin and have twelve stars at their ends (reflective of the flag of Europe). To the top left is a large number 1 followed, in smaller text, by the words "EURO CENT". The designer's initials, LL, appear to the right of the globe.

Starting in 2017 coins from individual member states have started adjusting their common side design to a new version, identified by smaller and more rounded numeral "1" and longer lines outside of the stars at the coin's circumference.

Obverse (national) sides

The obverse side of the coin depends on the issuing country. All have to include twelve stars (in most cases a circle around the edge), the engravers initials and the year of issue. New designs also have to include the name or initials of the issuing country. The side cannot repeat the denomination of the coin unless the issuing country uses an alphabet other than Latin (currently, Greece is the only such country, hence engraving "1 ΛΕΠΤΟ" upon its coins); Austria ignores this rule, engraving "EIN EURO CENT" on its coins.

Planned designs

Austria, Germany and Greece will also at some point need to update their designs to comply with guidelines stating they must include the issuing state's name or initial, and not repeat the denomination of the coin.

In addition, there are several EU states that have not yet adopted the euro, some of them have already agreed upon their coin designs; however, it is not known exactly when they will adopt the currency, and hence these are not yet minted. See enlargement of the Eurozone for expected entry dates of these countries.

Usage

The one- and two-cent coins were initially introduced to ensure that the transition to the euro was not used as an excuse by retailers to heavily round up prices. However, due to the cost of maintaining a circulation of low-value coins by business and the mints, Belgium, Finland, Ireland, Italy, the Netherlands and Slovakia round prices to the nearest five cents (Swedish rounding) if paying by cash, while producing only a handful of those coins for collectors, rather than general circulation. Despite this, the coins are still legal tender and produced outside these states, so if customers with one-cent coins minted elsewhere wish to pay with them, they may.

The Nederlandse Bank calculated it would save $36 million a year by not using the smaller coins. Other countries such as Germany favoured retaining the coins due to retailers' desire for €1.99 prices, which appear more attractive to the consumer than €2.00 (psychological pricing). According to a 2021 Eurobarometer survey of citizens across the Eurozone, 67% of respondents were in favor of the removal of the 1 and 2 cent coins and rounding of prices; with over 75% in Finland, Ireland, Italy and Slovakia. All countries in the eurozone showed a plurality of people in favor of the abolishment.

Nicknames
In Italy 1, 2 and 5 cents coins are called "ramini" meaning literally "small coppers".

References

External links

 

Euro coins
One-cent coins